Fatih Terim (born 4 September 1953) is a Turkish association football manager and former player. He is the former manager of Galatasaray, a position he previously held four times.

Terim has managed several clubs in Italy (Milan and Fiorentina) and Turkey, as well as the Turkish national football team, most recently from 2013 to 2017. In a survey conducted by the International Federation of Football History & Statistics (IFFHS) in 80 countries, he was placed among the best eight managers in the world, receiving his award at a ceremony held in Rothenburg, Germany, on 8 January 2001. Terim received a nomination for UEFA manager of the year 2008, and Eurosport named him the best coach at UEFA Euro 2008. In December 2008, he was ranked the seventh-best football manager in the world by World Soccer magazine in 2008. His Turkish nickname is "İmparator", and his Italian nickname is "Imperatore". Both names mean "emperor".

Club career 
In 1969, Terim began his professional football career with Adana Demirspor. Because of his financial difficulties, he was the only player in the team who was being paid secretly by the club at the time. He became the team captain three years later. Terim played for Adana Demirspor until 1974, when he joined Galatasaray as a sweeper on 8 July 1974. As the team captain, he had to fill in for injured defenders and eventually he ended up playing regularly as a sweeper/defender. Terim played 11 years for the Istanbul club. During that time, the club never won the Turkish league championship trophy.

He played for the Turkey national team 51 times between 1974 and 1985 and was the national team captain for 35 international matches, setting the national record in both categories at that time. He ended his playing career at Galatasaray in 1985. Abdullah Gegiç, a famous football coach with Partizan in the former Yugoslavia and Eskişehirspor in Turkey, knew Terim from his days as a central defender and described him as an intelligent defender with "Beckenbauer-like" qualities. Gegiç attributed Terim's successes as a coach to the unique understanding of the game that he developed while playing as a central defender.

Managerial career

Early years 
After retiring from professional football his first training appointment came from Jupp Derwall while they were both at Galatasaray. Terim's coaching career began when he was appointed the coach of Ankaragücü. He coached the club for 18 months before moving on to coach Göztepe in İzmir for a year. He had no significant success with either team. He was appointed as assistant to Turkey's national coach, Sepp Piontek, in 1990. He also coached the Turkey under-21 team. After serving as assistant coach for three years, he was appointed coach in 1993. Under his management, Turkey qualified for the final tournament of European Football Championship in 1996, for the first time in its history. Although they did not perform well in the tournament, losing all their matches and not scoring any goals, qualification was still considered a great achievement for Turkish football.

Galatasaray (first term) 
After Euro 1996, Terim signed a contract with Galatasaray. The club had invested in strong (international) players such as Gica Hagi, Gica Popescu, Taffarel and Ilie as well as high-potential (academy) players such as Emre. Under his management Galatasaray won the Turkish league championship for four consecutive years and the UEFA Cup in 2000, making Terim the most successful Galatasaray manager in its history. His departure allowed Mircea Lucescu to clinch the UEFA Super Cup in 2000 for Galatasaray.

Fiorentina 
Terim moved from Galatasaray to the Italian Serie A, signing a one-year contract with Fiorentina. His aggressive style of football and his tense relationship with club president and owner Vittorio Cecchi Gori made Terim popular among Fiorentina fans. With new boys Brazilian Leandro Amaral and Portugal's Nuno Gomes doing well up front, with a steadier defence and with Portuguese playmaker Rui Costa blossoming under Terim's constant praise and encouragement Fiorentina became a strong team in Italy. The league wins against Milan (4–0), Inter, Udinese and holding Juventus to a 3–3 draw came in a fortnight when the Florence club cruised into the final of the Coppa Italia eliminating Milan 4–2 on aggregate. Despite his poor start in the UEFA Cup (eliminated 5-3 on agg. by Tirol Innsbruck in the first round), Terim had managed to communicate something of himself to both his players and to the club's demanding fans. Even as Cecchi Gori was beginning to count the cost of sacking him, the fans made it clear that they were on the side of Terim.

However, later he announced that he would not renew his contract by the end of the season, because Cecchi Gori did not intend to make the investments that he requested. The team's performance declined significantly from then on because of his continuing clashes with Cecchi Gori led Terim to resign on 26 February 2001, before the season ended. Fiorentina director general Giancarlo Antognoni, one of the greatest players in the club's history, also resigned along with Terim's entire coaching staff, despite the fact that Cecchi Gori had begged him to stay.

The Romanian football legend Gheorghe Hagi praised his work in Florence: "In five months he built up a phenomenal side at Fiorentina. Name me another foreigner capable of that. He's extraordinary – he could coach any side." Prior his leave from Florence there were rumours that Terim would join Milan next season.

Milan 
 
On 18 June 2001, Terim signed a two year contract with Milan replacing the caretaker manager Cesare Maldini. He transformed Milan's system, employing a style very similar to the total football of Rinus Michels, playing a 4–3–1–2 formation with Rui Costa as a key player, whom he brought from his previous team, Fiorentina. Terim built a highly attacking side, but during this period Milan was also notorious for being vulnerable at the back, often conceding goals unexpectedly and drawing against "underdog" teams.
On 5 November 2001, after the 0–1 defeat against Torino his contract was terminated after only five months of work and he was replaced by Carlo Ancelotti, despite the fact that Terim had received a vote of confidence from Milan vice-president Galliani following a 1-1 draw with bottom-placed Venezia in mid-October. However Paolo Maldini had admitted that the players must share the blame for Terim's sacking as manager: "Terim's failure was also our failure. Now the team must look at themselves as there are no more excuses. Maybe it was the players' fault because we couldn't put Terim's teachings into action. Another reaction was made by midfielder Brocchi about the pressure from the board of directors to Terim: "From the beginning there was a lot of external pressure on Terim as well as many dubious episodes that made one think there wasn't 100% faith in him".

Return to Galatasaray (second term) 
In the summer of 2002, Terim returned to Galatasaray. However, internal problems within Galatasaray's management, financial difficulties at the club and the failure of his transfer policies led to a disappointing performance, and he resigned in March 2004, taking a break in his managing career. Clubs like Inter Milan and Roma tried to lure him back to Serie A, but he did not depart.

Turkey (second term) 
In the summer of 2005, Terim became the manager of the Turkey national team for a second time, taking charge of their last three qualifying matches (held in September and October 2005) – against Denmark, Ukraine and Albania – in UEFA qualifying Group 2 of the 2006 FIFA World Cup. Turkey finished second in the group and thus advanced to the two-leg play-off against Switzerland, who won the first leg 2–0 in Bern. Turkey won the second leg 4–2 in Istanbul, but Switzerland advanced to the 2006 World Cup finals on the away goals rule.

Turkey started Euro 2008 by losing to Portugal. Against Switzerland, they were trailing at half-time but snatched a win two minutes into stoppage time. In the final group match, against the Czech Republic, Turkey reversed a two-goal deficit by scoring three goals in the final 15 minutes. Their evenly matched quarter-final clash with Croatia went to a penalty shootout, which Turkey won. Turkey lost to Germany in the semi-finals. During their estimated 490 minutes of playing time in this tournament, Turkey only led for 13 minutes.

After the successful Euro 2008 campaign, Terim was recommended by former Newcastle United manager Bobby Robson for the Newcastle position, but he was not appointed. Terim's contract was extended to 2012 at the conclusion of the tournament, despite heavy speculation that he might return to Italy or go to England to manage at club level.

In 2010 World Cup UEFA qualifying, Group 5, as of April 2009, Turkey had won two matches, drawn two and lost two, leaving them four points behind second-placed Bosnia and Herzegovina. This performance saw Turkey move up to tenth position in the FIFA World Rankings. On 11 October 2009, seeing that his country could no longer finish in the top two of Group 5, Terim announced his resignation. Turkey finished Group 5 in third position.

Third term at Galatasaray 

Galatasaray failed to qualify for European football in the 2010–11 season. After internal conflict among board members and the poor performance of the team during the 2010–11 Süper Lig season, Galatasaray appointed a new chairman, Ünal Aysal. Aysal's first act was to appoint Terim, his first and only choice, as manager – his third time to manage Galatasaray.

Galatasaray finished the 2011–12 Süper Lig season with 77 points, nine points ahead of rivals Fenerbahçe. The top four teams in the regular season – Galatasaray, Fenerbahçe, Trabzonspor and Beşiktaş – entered the Championship Group of the European play-offs. A new round-robin play-off format was introduced this season for the first time in the Süper Lig. In the last round of the play-offs, Galatasaray won its 18th title with a scoreless draw against Fenerbahçe at the Şükrü Saracoğlu Stadium. It was one of Galatasaray's best seasons, marked by the good performances of young players such as Semih Kaya and Emre Çolak.

In the third week of the 2012–13 Süper Lig season, Terim earned his 200th win as a Galatasary coach against Bursaspor. In addition, Terim was invited to the UEFA Elite Managers Forum for a second time in 2012. (The first time was in 2002.) Galatasaray made a poor start to the 2012–13 UEFA Champions League season, losing the first two group matches in Group H, but they won three of their last four group matches to advance to the Round of 16. Galatasaray player Burak Yılmaz finished the group stages of the 2012–13 UEFA Champions League as top scorer, with 6 goals in 501 minutes, ahead of Cristiano Ronaldo, who scored the same number of goals in 540 minutes.

In the round of 16, Galatasaray eliminated Schalke 04 4–3 on aggregate. In the quarter-finals, they played Real Madrid – their first official match since the 2000–01 UEFA Champions League. Galatasaray lost 3–0 at Santiago Bernabéu Stadium, but won the second match 3–2 in Türk Telekom Arena. On 5 May 2013, Galatasaray secured its 19th title in the Süper Lig two weeks before the end of the season.

On 24 September 2013, Terim was relieved of his club duties after overseeing one win and three draws in four league matches in the 2013–14 Süper Lig season, plus a 6–1 home defeat in the 2013–14 Champions League group stage opening match against Real Madrid. The club's decision to sack Terim was taken after Terim and the board members had held a two-hour meeting at the Türk Telekom Arena in the afternoon of 24 September, followed by a unanimous vote by the board. The club stated Terim had rejected an offer of a two-year extension on his current contract, which had been due to expire in June 2014. Terim was directing a training session at the club's facilities when the board's decision was publicised later that day. As the news filtered out, dozens of supporters reportedly assembled in front of the training facilities to protest the decision, calling on the board to resign.

Turkey (third term) 
On 22 August 2013, Terim was appointed interim manager of Turkey, replacing Abdullah Avcı, ahead of four critical 2014 World Cup UEFA Group D qualifying matches. Turkey won their next three qualifying matches (against Andorra, Romania and Estonia), but lost their last qualifying match against the Netherlands 2–0 in Istanbul. Turkey finished Group D in fourth position and therefore did not qualify for the 2014 World Cup finals.

Fourth term at Galatasaray

2017–18 season 
On 22 December 2017, Terim was announced as manager of Galatasaray, replacing Igor Tudor, on a contract that will see him at the helm until the end of the 2018–19 season.

2017-18 season he became a seventh-time Turkish Süper Lig winner with Galatasaray.

2018–19 season 
On 19 May 2019, Galatasaray became the champion of 2018–19 Süper Lig season after in week 33. Terim won his eighth title in total and second consecutive Süper Lig trophy with Galatasaray. On 25 May 2019, during the cup ceremony at Türk Telekom Stadium, Galatasaray president Mustafa Cengiz announced that the club agreed on a 2+3 years new deal with Terim. He signed the new contract in front of 52,500 spectators.

2019–20 season 
On 8 July 2019, Terim celebrated his 45th anniversary with Galatasaray.

2020–21 season 
Galatasaray finished the 2020-21 season in second place, on goal difference and therefore did not become the champion for two consecutive seasons.

2021–22 season 
On 19 July 2021, the recently elected Galatasaray president Burak Elmas announced that they have signed a 3-year contract extension with Terim. This season was one of the toughest seasons for him at the club. Players such as Falcao and Donk had left the club and Terim had decided to invest in young potential players such as Cicâldău, Boey, Nelsson and Moruțan. However, early elimination from the Champions League (qualifying round) as well as many consecutive losses in Süper Lig (ended 10th by mid-season, 19 points behind the leader) caused lots of criticism of the coach by the fans and media. Galatasaray had ended the UEFA Europa League group stage on top position and Terim achieved the one and only positive result so far this season by qualifying to the round of 16 directly. However, after elimination against TFF First League side Denizlispor in the cup and a new defeat against Giresunspor at beginning of the second half of the season, many fans started calling the coach to resignation.

On 10 January 2022, he was relieved from his contract after the poor results  and replaced by Spanish coach Domènec Torrent.
On 13 January 2022, Terim shared a photo of his signature regarding the contract termination by the club via his personal social media account, mentioning that it was his last signature at Galatasaray.

Personal life 
He was born in Adana, Turkey, to Nuriye and Talat Terim. Talat, his father, is a Turkish Cypriot who emigrated to Turkey. He is married to Fulya Terim. They have two daughters, Merve and Buse.

On 23 March 2020, Terim received a positive diagnosis for coronavirus. He was discharged from hospital on 30 March 2020.

Career statistics

Player 
 Source:

International 
 Source:

International goals 
 Source:

Managerial statistics

Turkish Super Lig statistics with Galatasaray

Honours

Player 
Galatasaray

 Turkish Cup: 1975–76, 1981–82, 1984–85
 Turkish Super Cup: 1982

Manager 
Turkey U21

 Mediterranean Games: 1993

Turkey

 UEFA European Championship semi-finals: 2008

Galatasaray

 UEFA Cup: 1999–2000
 Süper Lig (8): 1996–97, 1997–98, 1998–99, 1999–2000, 2011–12, 2012–13, 2017–18, 2018–19
 Turkish Cup: 1998–99, 1999–2000, 2018–19
 Turkish Super Cup: 1996, 1997, 2012, 2013, 2019

Decorations 
 2008 Italy  Commendatore dell'Ordine della Stella della Solidarietà Italiana (Commander of the Order of the Star of Italian Solidarity) by the Italian state at a reception hosted by the Italian embassy in Ankara.

See also 
 List of UEFA Cup winning managers
 List of Turkey national football team managers

Notes

References

External links 

 
 
 Article at Turkish Football Magazine
 Profile at Mackolik.com

1953 births
A.C. Milan managers
ACF Fiorentina managers
Adana Demirspor footballers
Association football defenders
Expatriate football managers in Italy
Galatasaray S.K. (football) managers
Galatasaray S.K. footballers
Göztepe S.K. managers
Living people
MKE Ankaragücü managers
Recipients of the State Medal of Distinguished Service
Serie A managers
Sportspeople from Adana
Süper Lig managers
Süper Lig players
Turkey international footballers
Turkey national football team managers
Turkey under-21 international footballers
Turkey youth international footballers
Sportspeople of Turkish Cypriot descent
Turkish expatriate football managers
Turkish expatriate sportspeople in Italy
Turkish football managers
Turkish footballers
Turkish people of Cypriot descent
UEFA Cup winning managers
UEFA Euro 1996 managers
UEFA Euro 2008 managers
UEFA Euro 2016 managers